Craig Fisher (born June 30, 1970) is a Canadian former professional ice hockey player who currently works in the athletic administration for Ontario Tech University (UOIT), having previously served as the head coach of the UOIT hockey team.

Fisher grew up in Whitby, Ontario, where he and brother Mark played junior hockey.  Mark and Craig both played for the Oshawa Legionaires of the Ontario Junior Hockey League.  Mark would go on to play for McGill University, while Craig played US college hockey at Miami University.

Craig thrived at Miami, with 42 points (22 goals, 20 assists) in his 1988-89 freshman season, earning First-Team All-Rookie Central Collegiate Hockey Association (CCHA) honors, and then producing 66 points (37 goals, 29 assists) in his sophomore season, named to the First-Team All-CCHA Team for 1989-90.  Fisher had been drafted 56th overall in the 1988 NHL Entry Draft by the Philadelphia Flyers and turned pro at the end of the 1989-90 collegiate season. Fisher finished the season with Miami on March 3, 1990 and made his NHL debut with Philiadelphia some three weeks later, on March 27.

A prolific scorer, Fisher played 12 NHL games with the Flyers, Winnipeg Jets, and Florida Panthers, but spent much of his career playing for various American Hockey League (AHL) and International Hockey League (IHL) teams.  Fisher was part of the AHL championship Cape Breton Oilers, winning the Calder Cup in 1993.  He  then led the IHL in goals scored (74) in 1995-96 while playing for the Orlando Solar Bears.

In 1995, while playing for the Rochester Americans, Fisher suffered a violent collision, knocked unconscious and hitting his head on the ice.  His playing career would come to an end as a result of this traumatic brain injury.  Fisher would move into coaching, eventually becoming the head coach for the Whitby Fury, leading the team to a 31-19 (.609) record in 2012-13 and a 35-14 (.698) season in 2013-14.  He suffered another concussion behind the bench with Whitby in 2013, missing extensive time with the team as a result.  Having previously served at Ontario Tech as an assistant coach, Fisher was named as the head coach of the Ridgebacks in 2014, but was forced to resign shortly afterwards due to ongoing concussion symptoms.

Fisher lives in Whitby with his family and works for Ontario Tech as an athletic advisor, working to raise awareness of concussions in hockey and counseling athletes in dealing with concussion and TBI symptoms.

Career statistics

Regular season and playoffs

Awards and honours

References

External links
 

1970 births
Living people
Canadian expatriate ice hockey players in Germany
Canadian ice hockey left wingers
Cape Breton Oilers players
Carolina Monarchs players
Florida Panthers players
Hershey Bears players
Indianapolis Ice players
Kölner Haie players
Miami RedHawks men's ice hockey players
Moncton Hawks players
Orlando Solar Bears (IHL) players
Sportspeople from Oshawa
Philadelphia Flyers draft picks
Philadelphia Flyers players
Rochester Americans players
Utah Grizzlies (AHL) players
Winnipeg Jets (1979–1996) players